Lucky Jade is a 1937 British comedy crime film directed by Walter Summers and starring Betty Ann Davies, John Warwick and Syd Crossley. It was shot at Welwyn Studios. The film's sets were designed by the art director Duncan Sutherland. It was a quota quickie released by the British subsidiary of Paramount Pictures

Plot
A collector of jade has an accident leading to the theft of his valuable collection, with a maid posing as an actress wrongly suspected of the crime.

Cast
 Betty Ann Davies as Betsy Bunn 
 John Warwick as John Marsden 
 Claire Arnold as Mrs Sparsely 
 Syd Crossley as Rickets 
 Derek Gorst as Bob Grant 
 Gordon Court as Ricky Rickhart 
 Richard Littledale as Dingbat Eisan 
 Tony Wylde as Whitebait

References

Bibliography
 Low, Rachael. Filmmaking in 1930s Britain. George Allen & Unwin, 1985.
 Wood, Linda. British Films, 1927-1939. British Film Institute, 1986.

External links

1937 films
1930s crime comedy films
1930s English-language films
Films directed by Walter Summers
British crime comedy films
British black-and-white films
1937 comedy films
1930s British films
Films shot at Welwyn Studios
Films set in London
Quota quickies
Paramount Pictures films